Sclerostin domain-containing protein 1 is a protein that in humans is encoded by the SOSTDC1 gene.

Function 

This gene is a member of the sclerostin family and encodes an N-glycosylated, secreted protein with a C-terminal, cystine, knot-like domain. This protein functions as a bone morphogenetic protein (BMP) antagonist. Specifically, it directly associates with BMPs, prohibiting them from binding their receptors, thereby regulating BMP signaling during cellular proliferation, differentiation, and programmed cell death.

References

Further reading